Giannis Baltimas (born 21 June 1975) is a retired Greek football goalkeeper.

References

1975 births
Living people
Greek footballers
Panachaiki F.C. players
Doxa Drama F.C. players
Paniliakos F.C. players
Olympiacos Volos F.C. players
Ilisiakos F.C. players
Fostiras F.C. players
Olympiakos Nicosia players
Kallithea F.C. players
Kalamata F.C. players
Trikala F.C. players
Super League Greece players
Association football goalkeepers
Greek expatriate footballers
Expatriate footballers in Cyprus
Greek expatriate sportspeople in Cyprus
People from Achaea
Footballers from Western Greece